Rakesh Thakur (born 10 September 1991) is an Indian cricketer. He made his Twenty20 debut on 11 January 2021, for Goa in the 2020–21 Syed Mushtaq Ali Trophy.

References

External links
 

1991 births
Living people
Indian cricketers
Goa cricketers
Place of birth missing (living people)